Veronica Lang is an Australian-born actress, who started her career in England in theatre and television, before working in her native country, she also briefly worked in America. She won the 1977 AFI Award for Best Actress in a Supporting Role for her role in the film adaptation of Don's Party and the 1980 Logie Award for Best Supporting Actress in a Miniseries/Telemovie for A Good Thing Going.

Filmography

FILM

TELEVISION

Awards

References

External links

Australian television actresses
Australian film actresses
Possibly living people
Year of birth missing